Syed Sobri bin Syed Mohamad (born 24 May 1994) is a Malaysian footballer who plays as a central midfielder for Malaysia Premier League club Kelantan.

Club career

Kelantan
On 26 June 2021, Syed signed a contract with Malaysia Premier League club Kelantan.

References

External links 
 

Living people
People from Terengganu
Malaysian people of Malay descent
Malaysian footballers
Association football defenders
1994 births
Melaka United F.C. players
Terengganu F.C. II players
Kelantan F.C. players